Heliomorpha is a genus of Cercozoa, placed in its own family, Heliomorphidae. It used to be known as "Dimorpha", but that name was a junior synonym several times over.

References

Filosa
Cercozoa genera
Taxa named by Thomas Cavalier-Smith